Peter Morey (17981881) was the 2nd Michigan Attorney General.

Early life
Morey was born in Cazenovia, New York in 1798.

Career
Morey was a Democrat. Morey was admitted to the bar in 1831. He practiced law in New York for four years until in 1835 he moved to Tecumseh, Michigan. In 1837, Morey moved to Detroit. He served as Michigan Attorney General from 1837 to 1841. Morey then moved to back to Tecumseh for some years until finally moving to Marion, Ohio.

Death
Morey died in Marion, Ohio in 1881.

References

1798 births
1881 deaths
Michigan Democrats
New York (state) lawyers
Michigan Attorneys General
People from Cazenovia, New York
People from Tecumseh, Michigan
Lawyers from Detroit
20th-century American politicians
20th-century American lawyers
19th-century American lawyers